Barton Bridge or Barton Swing Bridge may refer to two bridges that cross the Manchester Ship Canal, in North West England:
 Barton Swing Aqueduct
 Barton Road Swing Bridge

Barton Bridge may also refer to the high level bridge that spans the Manchester Ship Canal as part of the M60 motorway (formerly the M63 motorway).